Charlie the Choo-Choo: From the World of The Dark Tower is a children's book by Stephen King, published under the pseudonym Beryl Evans. The story was written by Stephen King and published in King's previous novel The Dark Tower III: The Waste Lands: the book is found by Jake and in chapter 22 the story is intended to be creepy and give children nightmares. It was published by Simon & Schuster Books for Young Readers on November 11, 2016. The book appears in the first episode of the Apple TV+ miniseries Lisey's Story.

Plot
The book is about the titular locomotive and his engineer, Bob.

Background
The book was first revealed at San Diego Comic-Con, where a limited edition of 150 copies was given to attendees. Actress Allison Davies participated in a book signing at the event, portraying the fictional author Beryl Evans.

References

2016 children's books
Books by Stephen King
Trains in fiction
The Dark Tower (series) novels
Works published under a pseudonym
Children's books about rail transport
American picture books
Simon & Schuster books